Jean-Maurice Rothschild (1902–1998) was an interior designer and furniture artist, whose most famous works were for the cruise liner Normandie, and the restaurant of the Eiffel Tower.

References

External links
Normandie Exhibit Featuring His Work 
 Jean-Maurice Rothschild on Artnet

1902 births
1998 deaths
French furniture designers